Fayette is the name of a number of places in the United States of America. Many are named for General Gilbert du Motier, Marquis de Lafayette, a French officer who fought under General George Washington in the American Revolutionary War.

Fayette, Alabama
Fayette, Indiana
Fayette, Iowa
Fayette, Maine
Fayette, Michigan
Fayette, Mississippi 
Fayette, Missouri 
Fayette, New York
Fayette, Ohio 
Fayette, Utah
Fayette, West Virginia
Fayette, Wisconsin, a town
Fayette (community), Wisconsin, an unincorporated community
Fayette City, Pennsylvania
Fayette Historic State Park, Michigan

See also
Fayette County (disambiguation)
Fayette Township (disambiguation)
Fayetteville (disambiguation)
Lafayette (disambiguation)